DDT Is Coming to America was a professional wrestling event produced by DDT Pro-Wrestling (DDT), The event took place on April 4, 2019 at La Boom in Queens, New York. This event was broadcast live on FITE TV. This event was the first DDT show in the United States.

Event
During the event, the Ironman Heavymetalweight Championship changed hands several times during and inbetween matches. At 20:07, before the opening match, Makoto Oishi pinned Saki Akai to become the 1,351st champion.

During the delayed battle royale, Yoshihiko eliminated Makoto Oishi to become the 1,352nd champion, then Kazuki Hirata eliminated Yoshihiko to win the match and become the 1,353rd champion.

After that, at 20:40, Saki Akai pinned Kazuki Hirata to become the 1,354th champion.

After the last match, Makoto Oishi, Kazuki Hirata, Maki Itoh and Danshoku Dino became respectively the 1,355th, 1,356th, 1,357th and 1,358th champions by pinning each other successively.

Results

Delayed battle royale entrances and eliminations 
 – Winner

Footnotes

See also
2019 in professional wrestling

References

2019 in New York City
2019 in professional wrestling
April 2019 events in the United States
DDT Pro-Wrestling
Events in New York City
Professional wrestling in New York City
2010s in Queens